Barbara Madejczyk (born 30 September 1976 in Ustka) is a javelin thrower from Poland. Her personal best throw is 64.08 metres, achieved in June 2006 in Málaga.

Achievements

See also
Polish records in athletics

References

1976 births
Living people
People from Słupsk County
Polish female javelin throwers
Athletes (track and field) at the 2004 Summer Olympics
Athletes (track and field) at the 2008 Summer Olympics
Olympic athletes of Poland
Sportspeople from Pomeranian Voivodeship
Universiade medalists in athletics (track and field)
Universiade gold medalists for Poland
Medalists at the 2003 Summer Universiade
21st-century Polish women